The Great Salt Lake Desert (colloquially referred to as the West Desert) is a large dry lake in northern Utah, United States, between the Great Salt Lake and the Nevada border. It is a subregion of the larger Great Basin Desert, and noted for white evaporite Lake Bonneville salt deposits including the Bonneville Salt Flats.

Description

Several small mountain ranges occupy the edges of the desert, such as the Cedar Mountains, Lakeside Mountains, Silver Island Mountains, Hogup Mountains, Grassy Mountains, and Newfoundland Mountains. On the western edge of the desert, just across the border in Nevada, stands Pilot Peak in the Pilot Range.

The desert is cool during the winter and includes unusual plants adapted to the dry conditions. The salt crust covering the desert reforms yearly when the rain evaporates. The military's Utah Test and Training Range is in the northern portion of the desert.

History

During Jedediah Smith's 1826-27 expedition, Robert Evans nearly died while crossing the desert  and in the 1840s, westward emigrants used the Hastings Cutoff through  of Great Salt Lake desert to reduce the distance to California. The 1846 Donner Party's difficulties in making the crossing contributed to their becoming snowbound in the Sierra Nevada. Howard Stansbury explored the desert in 1849. In 1956, I-80 replaced the Wendover Cut-off across the desert, including a straight east-west section for ~ between the Cedar Mountains to the east and Wendover on the Utah/Nevada border.  Following a railway completed across the desert's Bonneville Salt Flats in 1910, the flats were first used as a speedway in 1914. The world records for highest land speeds are regularly broken here.

Recent discoveries 
In July 2022, archaeologists discovered about 88 footprints had been left behind by humans at least 12,000 years ago using ground-penetrating radar (GPR). So-called 'Ghost tracks' by archaeologists, footprints absorb moisture and are only visible when it rains and disappear when dry.

Climate
The Great Salt Lake Desert experiences a desert climate with hot summers and cold winters. The desert is an excellent example of a cold desert climate. The desert's elevation, 4,250 feet above sea level, makes temperatures cooler than lower elevation deserts, such as the Mojave. Due to the high elevation and aridity, temperatures drop sharply after sunset. Summer nights are comfortably cool. Winter highs are generally above freezing, and winter nights are bitterly cold, with temperatures often dropping below freezing.

References

External links

 
Deserts and xeric shrublands in the United States
Ecoregions of the United States
Deserts of Utah
Great Basin deserts
Geography of Box Elder County, Utah
Geography of Juab County, Utah
Geography of Tooele County, Utah